ND may refer to:

Arts and entertainment
 nD, a fictional species of alien in Invasion: Earth (TV series)
Nancy Drew, a fictional teenage sleuth in various media
Naughty Dog, an American video game developer
Nuclear Dawn, a Half-Life 2 game mod

Businesses
Norsk Data, a defunct Norwegian computer manufacturer
NetDocuments, a British document management company

Language
Nd (digraph), a digraph present in many African languages
Northern Ndebele language, by ISO 639-1 code

Places
North Dakota, a state of the United States
New Delhi, India's capital city
Notre Dame (disambiguation), a number of churches and colleges
Nguyen dynasty, unified Vietnamese empire (1802–1884)

Politics
New Democracy (Canada), a defunct party in Canada
New Democracy (Greece), one of the main center-right liberal political parties in Greece
National Democrats (Sweden), a far-right party in Sweden
New Democrats (France), a left-wing party in France
National Democracy (Poland), a former Polish political movement
 New Dawn (Algeria), a nationalist Algerian party
Nuclear disarmament, the dismantlement and proposed dismantling of nuclear weapons

Science and technology

Mathematics
 nd (elliptic function), one of Jacobi's elliptic functions

Medicine
NADH dehydrogenase, an enzyme
Non-distended, an abdominal distension clinical examination value
Naturopathic Doctor, a degree in naturopathic medicine
Notifiable disease, any disease that is required by law to be reported to government authorities

Physics
ND Experiment, a particle physics experiment in Novosibirsk, Russia
nD, the refractive index of a medium at a wavelength of 589.8 nm

Other uses in science and technology
Neighbor Discovery, an Internet protocol
Neodymium, symbol Nd, a chemical element
Neutral density filter, a type of filter used in photography
Contax N Digital, a digital camera
ND for nominal diameter in piping
ND MX-5 Miata, the fourth generation of the Mazda MX-5

Weapons and military
United States Navy Diver, an occupational rating
Negligent discharge, a careless discharge of a firearm
Norrlands dragonregemente, a cavalry regiment of the Swedish Army
Nuclear disarmament, the dismantlement and proposed dismantling of nuclear weapons

Other uses
National Diploma (Ireland), an academic qualification in the Republic of Ireland
New Dawn (disambiguation), with various meanings
Notitia Dignitatum, a historical document of the late Roman empire
Neurodiversity, variation in cognition and sociability (per the social model of disability)
n.d. for "no date", an abbreviation used in APA-style and other styles of bibliographic citations